Manhattan Club may refer to:

Manhattan Club (social club), Manhattan, New York, 1865–1979
Manhattan Club (nightclub), East St. Louis, Illinois
Manhattan Club, a timeshare portion of the Park Central Hotel in Midtown Manhattan, New York